The Philatelic and Postal Museum of Greece is a museum dedicated to the philately and postal history of Greece located in Athens, at the junction of Stadiou Square and Fokianou Street, next to the Panathenaic Stadium (Kallimarmaro). 

The establishment and operation of the Philatelic and Postal Museum was a long-standing request of the Hellenic Post Office Service and especially of the philatelic community. The project finally received state support in 1966. In 1970, the year of the establishment of the Hellenic Post Organization, a great effort began for the collection and classification of museum material along with the search for the appropriate location to house the museum. The solution was finally given in 1977 by Nia and Andrea Stratos who donated the building. Thus, the Philatelic and Postal Museum started its operation on October 30, 1978, as a branch of the Hellenic Post (ELTA). With the intention of the government for the privatization of ELTA, it was initially decided to include the Museum in the Ministry of Development and Transport. Today, the Museum lies under the jurisdiction of the Ministry of Digital Governance. 

The responsibilities of the Philatelic and Postal Museum are the recording, study, research, documentation, maintenance, acquisition, publication, promotion, and storage of the Hellenic Philatelic and Postal treasures. 

In the Museum the visitor can see objects used by the united Postal, Telegraph, Telephone Service (mailboxes, postmen bags, horns and uniforms, envelope sealing machines, safes, cancellation devices, bicycles and motorcycles, dispatch materials), the display of the first-ever Hellenic stamps dating since 1861, the metal plates used for their printing, stamp sheets, stamp proofs, detailed and rough layouts, first day covers, commemorative cachets and painting layouts of famous artists who designed stamps.

See also
 Hellenic Post

External links 
 Official page

Museums in Athens
Philatelic museums
Greece